Darrell Megail Baker Jr. (born March 27, 1998) is an American football cornerback for the Indianapolis Colts of the National Football League (NFL). Born in Panama City, he grew up in Hephzibah, Georgia, and played college football for the Georgia Southern Eagles.

Early life and education
Baker was born on March 27, 1998, in Panama City, to two United States Army veterans. He was raised in Hephzibah, Georgia, and attended Hephzibah High School, where he participated in football and track and field, playing as a cornerback and wide receiver in the former. As a junior in football, he made several key plays in their regular season finale to help them reach the state playoffs, being named The Augusta Chronicle player of the week. As a senior in track, Baker won the state championship in the long jump and was named "Boys' track athlete of the year" by the Chronicle.

Baker began attending Georgia Southern University in 2016, and was a walk-on member of their football team. He spent his true freshman season as a redshirt. In 2017, his second year with the program, he played in 12 games, appearing on 377 snaps, and recorded 18 tackles and one interception along with a forced fumble. The following season, Baker appeared in nine matches and recorded six tackles and one interception, while appearing on 231 plays.

As a junior in 2019, Baker played in all 12 games and started three, recording two pass breakups as well as 23 tackles, while seeing action on a total of 280 snaps. He saw his first action as a full-time starter in 2020, starting all 12 games and posting 34 tackles, seven pass breakups and an interception. Baker was named third-team all-conference at the end of the season by Pro Football Focus (PFF).

After receiving an extra year of eligibility due to the COVID-19 pandemic, Baker opted to return to Georgia Southern for a sixth season in 2021. He started eight games and appeared in a total of 10, and tallied while playing 499 snaps 32 tackles, eight pass breakups and a forced fumble. He finished his college career with 111 tackles, three interceptions, two forced fumbles and 18 pass breakups.

Professional career

Arizona Cardinals
After going unselected in the 2022 NFL Draft, Baker was signed by the Arizona Cardinals as an undrafted free agent. He was waived on August 29, during the roster cuts period. After being waived by Arizona, Baker had tryouts with the Green Bay Packers and Indianapolis Colts.

Indianapolis Colts
Baker was signed to the Colts' practice squad on September 13. He was elevated to the active roster for their Week 15 game against the Minnesota Vikings, and made his NFL debut in the 39–36 loss, appearing on 14 special teams snaps. He was signed to the active roster on December 28. Baker recovered a fumble in the Colts' Week 18 game against the Houston Texans.

References

1998 births
Living people
American football cornerbacks
American football wide receivers
Panamanian players of American football
Players of American football from Georgia (U.S. state)
People from Panama City
People from Hephzibah, Georgia
Georgia Southern Eagles football players
Arizona Cardinals players
Indianapolis Colts players